Siberian Light Aviation - (SiLA) (Sibirskaya Legkaya aviatsiya, "Siberian Light Aviation") is a Russian airline operating turboprop aircraft for regional flights in Siberia.  It received its air operator certificate for commercial transportation in 2014. In Russian, the word "sila" means "force".

Fleet 
As of July 2021 the SiLA fleet included these aircraft:

Accidents 
 On 16 July 2021, Siberian Light Aviation Flight 42, an An-28 operating from Kedrovy to Tomsk, Russia, suffered dual engine failure around half an hour into the flight. The aircraft attempted an emergency landing in the Siberian wilderness but overturned on landing. The aircraft was written off but all 14 passengers and four crew survived. 
 On 12 September 2021, Siberian Light Aviation Flight 51, a Let L-410 operated by Aeroservice on behalf of SiLA, from Irkutsk Airport to Kazachinskoye Airport, crashed in a forest about 4 km short of the runway near Kazachinskoye Airport. SiLA reported the aircraft was on its second approach in heavy fog when it crashed. Although the two crew and 14 passengers survived the crash, the co-pilot and three passengers later died from injuries sustained in the accident.

References

External links 
 Official website 

Airlines established in 2016
Airlines of Russia
Companies based in Moscow
Cargo airlines of Russia
Russian companies established in 2016